A special election was held in  in 1817 to fill two vacancies in the 15th Congress, both of which had occurred before the start of that Congress.  The vacancies were left by the death of members-elect Sylvanus Backus (F) on February 15, 1817 and Charles Dennison (F) who declined the seat.

Election results
As there were two vacancies in an at-large district, the top two candidates were elected to represent Connecticut.

Huntington and Terry took their seats with the rest of the 15th Congress.

See also
List of special elections to the United States House of Representatives

Notes

References

Connecticut 1817 At-large
1817 At-large
Connecticut 1817 At-large
Connecticut At-large
United States House of Representatives
United States House of Representatives 1817 At-large